Anna Torv (born 7 June 1979) is an Australian actress. She is known for her roles as Olivia Dunham on the Fox science fiction series Fringe (2008–2013), Wendy Carr in the Netflix crime thriller series Mindhunter (2017–2019), and Tess in the HBO post-apocalyptic drama series The Last of Us (2023). Her performance in Fringe earned her four Saturn Awards for Best Actress on Television and nominations for the Critics' Choice Television Award for Best Actress in a Drama Series.

Early life
Torv was born in Melbourne on 7 June 1979, the daughter of Susan (née Carmichael), of Scottish descent and Hans Arvid Torv, of Estonian ancestry. She grew up on the Gold Coast and has a younger brother. She is estranged from her father. Her paternal aunt, journalist Anna Mann dePeyster (née Torv; formerly Murdoch) was married to media mogul Rupert Murdoch for 31 years; through this marriage, Torv is the cousin of Elisabeth, Lachlan, and James Murdoch. She attended All Saints Anglican School and Benowa State High School, graduating from Benowa in 1996. She graduated from the National Institute of Dramatic Art with a performing arts degree in 2001.

Career

In 2003, Torv played the role of Ophelia with the Bell Shakespeare Company in John Bell's production of Hamlet. In 2004, she joined the cast of Australia's acclaimed television drama The Secret Life of Us, playing Nikki Martel.

In 2005, Torv recorded a series of audio books for Scholastic Australia's Solo Collection, including titles Little Fingers, Jack's Owl, Spike, and Maddy in the Middle and later voiced Nariko in the 2007 video game Heavenly Sword.

She then appeared in the BBC series Mistresses in 2008. From 2008 to 2013, Torv played Agent Olivia Dunham in the American television series Fringe. She received an Australians in Film Breakthrough award in 2009. She has been nominated five times for the Saturn Award for Best Television Actress from 2009 to 2013, winning a total of four times. Torv appeared as Virginia Grey on HBO's mini-series The Pacific and later starred in a CollegeHumor Original video as a tyrannical traffic cop. In 2014, Torv reprised her role as Nariko in the film adaptation of Heavenly Sword.

In March 2016, Torv was cast in the role of Wendy Carr, an FBI consultant, in the Netflix drama Mindhunter.

In July 2021, Torv was cast in the role of Tess in the HBO post-apocalyptic series The Last of Us. The show premiered in January 2023; despite being a guest role, Torv's performance was seen as an early highlight, with Bernard Boo of Den of Geek writing: "With just about an episode and a half, the terrific Anna Torv leaves an indelible impression as Joel's no-nonsense ride-or-die Tess before literally exiting the series with a bang [...]".

Torv played newsreader Helen Norville in the ABC series The Newsreader, released in August 2021, for which she won the AACTA award for Best Lead Actress in a Drama Series and also the 2022 Logie Award for Most Outstanding Actress.

In 2021, Torv also appeared in the television series Fires, produced by the ABC Television network, about the 2019–20 bushfire season mega-fires which devastated Australia.

Personal life
In December 2008, Torv married American actor Mark Valley, with whom she co-starred in Fringe. In April 2010, it was reported that the couple had "ended their marriage" several months prior.

Torv does not use social media. A resident of Los Angeles for over a decade, she sold her home there and returned to Australia's Gold Coast shortly after the COVID-19 pandemic began in early 2020.

Filmography

Film

Television

Theatre

Video games

Awards and nominations

References

External links
 
 

1979 births
21st-century Australian actresses
Actresses from Melbourne
Actresses from the Gold Coast, Queensland
Australian expatriate actresses in the United States
Australian film actresses
Australian Shakespearean actresses
Australian television actresses
Australian video game actresses
Australian voice actresses
Living people
Logie Award winners
National Institute of Dramatic Art alumni
Australian people of Estonian descent
Murdoch family